Willy Schäfer may refer to:

Willy Schäfer (actor) (1933–2011), German television actor
Willy Schäfer (handballer) (1913–1980), Swiss Olympic field handball player